CT4N, formerly known as Nottingham Voluntary Transport and then as Nottingham Community Transport, is a charity and bus operator based in the city of Nottingham, England. The bus operator, CT4N Ltd, is a wholly owned subsidiary of the CT4N Charitable Trust, a registered charity that provides transport solutions to reduce social isolation and promote community cohesion across Nottingham and Nottinghamshire.

History
CT4N was founded in 1979 as Nottingham Voluntary Transport with four vehicles. In 1988 it became Nottingham Community Transport, a limited company and registered charity. In 1998 it moved to its current headquarters at Sherwood Bus Garage, formerly the Sherwood Tram Depot. In 2018 CT4N officially launched with all contracted bus services transferring to the new commercial arm. Nottingham Community Transport purchased a new minibus for the Group Travel service, with support from the Postcode Lottery.

The current headquarters of CT4N are based at the former Sherwood Tram Depot in Nottingham, originally built for Nottingham Corporation Tramways in 1900. CT4N has additional operating bases at the Queens Drive park and ride site in Nottingham, at the East Midlands Gateway, and at Mansfield Woodhouse.

Services
CT4N operates a number of services in Nottingham and Nottinghamshire, including the Medilink bus service that connects the city's two main hospitals, the Queen's Medical Centre and Nottingham City Hospital. They also operate the Easylink door-to-door service for people who may struggle to use the existing bus and tram services in Greater Nottingham.

Criticism
In April 2020, a bus driver employed by CT4N died with COVID-19 symptoms. The firm was accused by the National Union of Rail, Maritime and Transport Workers (RMT) of a "lack of care” towards staff with its general secretary Mick Cash calling for a Health & Safety Executive investigation, amid claims by anonymous staff members to the BBC that until recently, there had been almost no protocols to protect them from COVID-19, including lack of social distancing signage, hand sanitiser running out and drivers still accepting cash payments. CT4N said it had stopped cash handling, operated more buses at peak hours to avoid overcrowding and improved hand-washing facilities.

See also
List of bus operators of the United Kingdom

References

External links
CT4N official website

Bus operators in Nottinghamshire
Charities based in Nottinghamshire
Companies based in Nottingham
Transport in Nottingham